West Flemish (West-Vlams or West-Vloams or Vlaemsch (in French-Flanders)) is a collection of Dutch dialects spoken in western Belgium and the neighbouring areas of France and the Netherlands.

West Flemish is spoken by about a million people in the Belgian province of West Flanders, and a further 50,000 in the neighbouring Dutch coastal district of Zeelandic Flanders (200,000 if including the closely related dialects of Zeelandic) and 10-20,000 in the northern part of the French department of Nord. Some of the main cities where West Flemish is widely spoken are Bruges, Dunkirk, Kortrijk, Ostend, Roeselare and Ypres.

West Flemish is listed as a "vulnerable" language in UNESCO's online Red Book of Endangered Languages. The language has its own dedicated Wikipedia.

Phonology
West Flemish has a phonology that differs significantly from that of Standard Dutch, being similar to Afrikaans in the case of long E, O and A, and where Standard Dutch has sch, Flemish, like Afrikaans, has sk. However, the best known traits are the replacement of Standard Dutch (pre-)velar fricatives g and ch in Dutch with glottal  h ,. The following differences are listed by their Dutch spelling, as some different letters have merged their sounds in Standard Dutch but remained separate sounds in West Flemish. Pronunciations can also differ slightly from region to region.

 ie -  is longer 

Standard Dutch also has many words with an -en suffix (mostly plural forms of verbs and nouns). While Standard Dutch and most dialects do not pronounce the final n, West Flemish typically drops the e and pronounces the n inside the base word. For base words already ending with n, the final n sound is often lengthened to clarify the suffix. That makes many words become similar to those of English: beaten, listen etc.

The short o  can also be pronounced as a short u, a phenomenon also occurring in Russian and some other Slavic languages, called akanye. That happens spontaneously to some words, but other words keep their original short o sounds. Similarly, the short a  can turn into a short o in some words spontaneously.

The diphthong ui does not exist in West Flemish and is replaced by a long u or a long ie. That often causes similarities to ranchers English. 

Here are some examples showing the sound shifts that are part of the vocabulary:

This is as an example as a lot of words are not the same. The actual word used for Kom is Menne.

Grammar

Plural form 
Plural forms in Standard Dutch most often add -en, but West Flemish usually uses -s, like the Lower Saxon Germanic dialects and even more prominently in English in which -en has become very rare. Under the influence of Standard Dutch, -s is being used by fewer people, and younger speakers tend to use -en.

Verb conjugation 
The verbs zijn ("to be") and hebben ("to have") are also conjugated differently.

Double subject 
West Flemish often has a double subject.

Articles 
Standard Dutch has an indefinite article that does not depend on gender, unlike in West Flemish. However, a gender-independent article is increasingly used. Like in English, n is pronounced only if the next word begins with a vowel sound.

Conjugation of yes and no 
Another feature of West Flemish is the conjugation of ja and nee ("yes" and "no") to the subject of the sentence. That is somewhat related to the double subject, but even when the rest of the sentence is not pronounced, ja and nee are generally used with the first part of the double subject. There is also an extra word, toet, negates the previous sentence but gives a positive answer. It's an abbreviation of " 't en doe 't" - it does it.

Ja and nee can also all be strengthened by adding mo- or ba-. Both mean "but" and are derived from Dutch but or maar) and can be even used together (mobajoat).

See also 

 Flemish
 Dutch dialects
 Flemish people (Flemings or Vlamingen)
 French Flemish
 Hebban olla vogala
 Westhoek

References

Further reading

External links 

 Euromosaic report on West Flemish (thus Dutch) in France

Dutch dialects
Languages of France
Languages of Belgium
Languages of the Netherlands
Flanders
Culture of Zeeland
Sluis
Zeelandic Flanders
Vulnerable languages